The 1944 Florida gubernatorial election was held on November 7, 1944. Democratic nominee Millard Caldwell defeated Republican nominee Bert L. Acker with 78.94% of the vote.

Primary elections
Primary elections were held on May 2, 1944, with the Democratic runoff held on May 23, 1944.

Democratic primary

Candidates
J. Edwin Baker, former State Senator
Millard Caldwell, former U.S. Representative for the 3rd district
Ernest R. Graham, State Senator
Robert A. (Lex) Green, U.S. Representative for the at-large district
Raymond Sheldon, State Senator
Frank D. Upchurch, Mayor of St. Augustine

Results

Republican primary

Candidates
Bert L. Acker, public relations consultant, unsuccessful candidate for Florida's 4th US Congressional district in 1940 and 1942.
Edward T. Keenan

Results

General election
Bert Acker who ran as a Republican, would be against the New Deal in his campaign. He also wanted to eliminate laws he thought were useless and conflicting. Acker was in favor of leasing lands owned by the state government to be used by farmers and cattle ranchers. Acker wanted to allow mining and oil production to be done on state owned lands as well. Acker wanted to see the sugar industry in the state expanded as well. Acker was against taxes that were created as a result of World War II in the state and wanted to exempt homes that were valued at $15,000 from state taxes. In terms of infrastructure, he supported expanding the state highway system and widening roads physically themselves along with improving safety on bridges.

Candidates
Millard Caldwell, Democratic
Bert Acker, Republican

Results

References

Bibliography
 
 
 

1944
Florida
Gubernatorial
November 1944 events